is a river that flows through Yokohama, Japan. It is 14 km long and over 80 bridges are built on the river. There are large numbers of cherry trees located near the river.

Gallery

External links

 Ooka River 

Rivers of Kanagawa Prefecture
Rivers of Japan